Karl Broughton (born 26 June 1971) is an English former professional snooker player.

Career

Broughton was born in 1971, turning professional in 1991. He entered the top 64 in the world rankings at the end of the 1995/1996 season, finishing it at 57th having enjoyed the best performance of his career at the 1996 International Open. There, Broughton defeated Mark O'Sullivan, Oliver King, Anthony Davies, Darren Morgan, Wayne Jones and Chris Small before losing his quarter-final match, 2–5 to John Higgins.

The following season, Broughton reached the last 16 of the 1996 UK Championship, where he met Alain Robidoux and lost 8–9.

Little success followed after Broughton reached his highest ranking of 41st for the 1997/1998 season, and he finished the 2000/2001 season 119th in the world, thereafter being relegated from the professional tour.

References

External links 
Karl Broughton at snookerdatabase.co.uk

English snooker players
1971 births
Living people
Sportspeople from London